Beef bun is a type of Hong Kong pastry. It is one of the most standard pastries in Hong Kong and can also be found in most Chinatown bakery shops. The bun has a ground beef filling, sometimes including pieces of onions.

See also
 Ham and egg bun
 Tuna bun
 List of buns
 List of stuffed dishes

References

Hong Kong breads
Beef dishes
Buns
Stuffed dishes